The Wenzel Pit is a former silver mine in the Zinken Frohnbach in Oberwolfach in the Black Forest in southern Germany. The pit had its heyday in the Napoleonic era, but has been a  show mine since 2001.

History 
Silver has been mined here since the early 14th century; but after several decades they could find no more and the mine was closed. Not until about 1760 was silver found again in the mineshafts under the direction of the principality mining clerk (Bergschreiber), Kapf. This prospecting work discovered several silver deposits and mining recommenced.

Today 
After the founding of the Show Mines Friends Association (Förderverein Besucherbergwerke) in 1997 the old silver mine was restored in 1999 and developed for visitors. In 2001 the work was completed and the show mine was opened to the public.

External links 
 Wenzel Pit on the Oberwolfach website
 Photographs of the Wenzel Pit

Show mines
Former mines in Germany
Silver mines in Germany
Museums in Baden-Württemberg
Black Forest
Ortenaukreis